The Juno is a Swedish motor vessel, and former steam ship, that was built in 1874 at Motala for the Göta canal. According to her owners, she is the oldest passenger ship with onboard accommodation still in service and she is a listed historic ship of Sweden.

References

1874 ships
Passenger ships of Sweden
Ships built in Sweden